The Elmer Ferguson Memorial Award is an accolade presented annually to a print newspaper columnist or reporter in recognition of their achievements covering the game of ice hockey. The award is "to recognize distinguished members of the newspaper profession whose words have brought honor to journalism and to hockey." The Hockey Hall of Fame established the accolade in 1984 and named it after the Montreal-based Canadian newspaper sports journalist Elmer Ferguson. Early in the year, the recipient is chosen by a committee of members from the Professional Hockey Writers' Association. The winner receives the award from the Hockey Hall of Fame at a ceremony held at BCE Place, Toronto, Ontario, Canada. Each recipient receives a  glass plaque that is put on display on two glass columns in the media section of the Hockey Hall of Fame. The ceremony associated with the accolade takes place separately to the induction of players into the Hockey Hall of Fame as -- despite widespread confusion on the issue -- media honorees are not considered full inductees.

During the 37 years the award has been active, there have been a total of 62 winners. The first 17 recipients -- Jacques Beauchamp, Jim Burchard, Red Burnett, Dink Carroll, Jim Coleman, Ted Damata, Marcel Desjardins, Jack Dulmage, Milt Dunnell, Ferguson, Tom Fitzgerald, Trent Frayne, Al Laney, Joe Nichols, Basil O'Meara, Jim Vipond and Lewis Walter -- were honored in 1984. At least two journalists were named winners each year until 1990. There was no winner in each of 1992, 1994, 1996 and 2021. Helene Elliott, a writer for the Los Angeles Times, became the first female recipient in 2005. She was also the first woman to be honored in the media section of one of the Big Four team Sports Halls of Fame. The award has been presented posthumously on eight occasions, seven of the initial 23 honourees over the first two classes (1984, 1985), and Dave Fay in 2007 (award ceremony held four months after his death). Journalists who have worked for the Toronto Star have been recognised seven times, followed by The Globe and Mail reporters with six and Le Journal de Montréal on five occasions. Each of the 62 winners have been journalists from either Canada or the United States.

Recipients

Statistics

See also
 BBWAA Career Excellence Award

References

External links
 

Ice hockey trophies and awards
Sports writing awards
National Hockey League mass media